Public corporation may refer to:

 Government-owned corporation
 Public company, i.e. a limited liability company that offers its securities for sale to the public
 Statutory corporation, i.e. a corporation created by statute that is owned in part or in whole by a government, such as municipal councils, bar councils, universities)